Henry Muller may refer to:

 Henry Müller (1896–1982), German footballer
 Henry Muller (writer) (1902–1980), French writer, journalist and book publisher
 Henry J. Muller (1917–2022), American Army brigadier general
 Henry J. Muller (CERDEC), director for the U.S. Army Communications-Electronics Research, Development and Engineering Center